Thomas Eynns (died 1578), of York and Heslington, Yorkshire, was an English politician.

He was a Member of the Parliament of England for Aldborough in 1571, Cardiganshire in 1542, Heytesbury in 1547, Scarborough in March 1553, Thirsk in October 1553, 1558, 1559, 1563 and Boroughbridge in 1572.
In 1568 he built Heslington Hall near York for his use as Secretary and Keeper of the Seal to the Council of the North.

References

Year of birth missing
1578 deaths
Politicians from York
Members of the Parliament of England for constituencies in Yorkshire
Members of the Parliament of England (pre-1707) for constituencies in Wales
English MPs 1542–1544
English MPs 1547–1552
English MPs 1553 (Edward VI)
English MPs 1553 (Mary I)
English MPs 1558
English MPs 1559
English MPs 1563–1567
English MPs 1571
English MPs 1572–1583